Jonathan Hecht is an American attorney and politician who served as a member of the Massachusetts House of Representatives for the 29th Middlesex district from 2009 to 2021.

Early life and education 
Born in Cambridge, Massachusetts, Hecht spent his youth in Belmont, attending Belmont Public Schools. He received a Bachelor of Arts degree in history from Stanford University in 1981, a Juris Doctor from Harvard Law School in 1988, and a Master of Arts in law and diplomacy from The Fletcher School of Law and Diplomacy at Tufts University in 1990.

Career 
Hecht was a New York City attorney before working as a program officer for human rights and governance for the Ford Foundation in Beijing from 1990 to 1994. He was a research fellow and law lecturer in East Asian legal studies at Harvard Law School from 1994 to 1998. He co-founded the China Law Center at Yale Law School in 1999 and was its deputy director until 2006.
 
A former board member of the Arsenal Center for the Arts, Hecht won a seat on the Watertown Town Council in 2005, later serving as chair the council's budget, economic development, and rules committees.
 
Elected as a Democrat to the 29th Middlesex District seat in the Massachusetts House of Representatives in 2008, Hecht is Vice Chair of the Elder Affairs Committee and a member of the House Committee on Post Audit and Oversight and the Joint Committee on Children, Families and Persons with Disabilities. He is a member of the Mental Health Caucus, Massachusetts Bay Transportation Authority Caucus, and Urban Parks Caucus.
 
In December 2011, Hecht was a candidate for the Democratic nomination in the special election to replace Steven Tolman in the Massachusetts Senate, but lost to state representative Will Brownsberger in the primary election.

Personal life 
Hecht and his wife Lora Sabin, a public health economist at Boston University School of Public Health, reside in Watertown and have four children.

See also
 2019–2020 Massachusetts legislature

References

External links
Official web site
Campaign web site

Year of birth missing (living people)
Living people
Democratic Party members of the Massachusetts House of Representatives
Stanford University alumni
Harvard Law School alumni
The Fletcher School at Tufts University alumni
Politicians from Cambridge, Massachusetts
People from Belmont, Massachusetts
People from Watertown, Massachusetts
21st-century American politicians